Dina Sassoli (15 August 1920 – 24 March 2008) was an Italian film actress. She was born on 15 August 1920, in Rimini, Emilia-Romagna, Italy. She was best known for her work with Italian director Mario Camerini. She died on 24 March 2008 in Rome, Italy.

Selected filmography
 Kean (1940)
 The Betrothed (1941)
 Two Anonymous Letters (1945)
 Un giorno nella vita (1946) 
 The Mill on the Po (1949)
 Little Lady (1949)
 Flying Squadron (1949)
 Cameriera bella presenza offresi... (1951)
 The Last Sentence (1951)
 I figli non si vendono (1952)
 The Other Side of Paradise (1953)
 And Agnes Chose to Die (1976)
 Oggetti smarriti (1980)
 Voltati Eugenio (1980)

References

External links

Italian film actresses
People from Rimini
1920 births
2008 deaths
Italian stage actresses
Italian television actresses
20th-century Italian actresses